Guihaia is a genus of three species of dioecious palms found in China and Vietnam. Perhaps its most distinctive characteristic is that it is the only palm with palmate leaves that has reduplicate (A-shaped) leaf folds. All other palmate leaves have induplicate (V-shaped) leaf folds. Guihaia lancifolia has undivided leaves.

Species

References

Coryphoideae
Arecaceae genera
Flora of China
Flora of Vietnam
Dioecious plants